Gayon Evans (born 15 January 1990) is a Jamaican sprinter. She won a silver medal in the 4 × 100 metres relay at the 2017 IAAF World Relays.

International competitions

1Disqualified in the quarterfinals
2Did not start in the semifinals

Personal bests
Outdoor
100 metres – 11.22 (+1.0 m/s, Gold Coast 2018)
200 metres – 23.18 (+1.3 m/s, Kingston 2017)
400 metres – 55.46 (Annapolis 2014)
Indoor
60 metres – 7.14 (Karlsruhe 2017)
200 metres – 23.36 (Boston 2014)
400 metres – 56.22 (New York 2013)

References

1990 births
Living people
Jamaican female sprinters
Commonwealth Games medallists in athletics
Commonwealth Games silver medallists for Jamaica
Commonwealth Games bronze medallists for Jamaica
Athletes (track and field) at the 2018 Commonwealth Games
People from Manchester Parish
Competitors at the 2014 Central American and Caribbean Games
21st-century Jamaican women
Medallists at the 2018 Commonwealth Games